Cola philipi-jonesii is a species of flowering plant in the family Malvaceae. It is found only in Nigeria. It is threatened by habitat loss.

References

philipi-jonesii
Endemic flora of Nigeria
Endangered flora of Africa
Taxonomy articles created by Polbot
Taxa named by Ronald William John Keay